The 2019 Western Carolina Catamounts team represented Western Carolina University as a member of the Southern Conference (SoCon) during the 2019 NCAA Division I FCS football season. Led by eighth-year head coach Mark Speir, the Catamounts compiled an overall record of 3–9 with a mark of 2–6 in conference play, placing eighth in the SoCon. Western Carolina played their home games at Bob Waters Field at E. J. Whitmire Stadium in Cullowhee, North Carolina.

Previous season

The Catamounts finished the 2018 season 3–8, 1–7 in SoCon play to finish in eighth place.

Preseason

Preseason polls
The SoCon released their preseason media poll and coaches poll on July 22, 2019. The Catamounts were picked to finish in eighth place in both polls.

Preseason All-SoCon Teams
The Catamounts placed three players on the preseason all-SoCon teams.

Offense

1st team

Tyrie Adams – QB

Owen Cosenke – TE

Defense

1st team

Ronald Kent – DB

Schedule

Game summaries

Mercer

at NC State

North Greenville

at Chattanooga

Gardner–Webb

at The Citadel

at Wofford

Furman

at VMI

East Tennessee State

Samford

at Alabama

References

Western Carolina
Western Carolina Catamounts football seasons
Western Carolina Catamounts football